Sir Philip Cohen  (born 22 July 1945) is a British researcher, academic and Royal Medal winner based at the Medical Research Council Protein Phosphorylation and Ubiquitylation Unit, School of Life Sciences at the University of Dundee. 

During the 1990s he was the world's third most cited professor (and the second most cited in the fields of biology and biochemistry) and has been described by Professor Garry Taylor of the University of St Andrews as "one of the world’s top scientists". and by Professor Sir Peter Downes as "arguably the UK's leading biochemist and an iconic figure in UK science". 

As of 2008 he has written over 470 peer-reviewed papers and given over 250 invited lectures in 33 countries, and has been repeatedly linked to a move of biotechnology companies to Dundee and the economic regeneration that came with it, to the point where 15% of the local economy is derived from biotech companies and their employees. His work has also seen Dundee attracting some of the world's best scientists, with over 1% of the world's most cited scientists residing in Dundee and fundraising of more than £35 million over the last 10 years to help attract them.

Early life and career
He was born in Middlesex, and after leaving Hendon County Grammar School he attended University College London, where he was awarded a BSc in 1966 with first class honours and a PhD in 1969 under Michael Rosemeyer. 

After leaving UCL he spent two years at the University of Washington doing postgraduate work with Edmond H. Fischer before returning to Britain in 1971 to become a lecturer at the University of Dundee, where he continues to work. He was made a reader in 1978 and gained a personal chair in 1981. 

In 1982, he was made a fellow of the European Molecular Biology Organization, and in 1984 he became a Royal Society Research professor and elected a fellow of both the Royal Society of Edinburgh and Royal Society. In 1990 he was made Director of the Medical Research Council Protein Phosphorylation Unit, a position he held until 2012. Also in 1990 he was made a fellow of the Academia Europaea. In 1993, he was made a fellow of UCL and in the 1998 Queen's Birthday Honours was knighted, served as a founding member of the Academy of Medical Sciences and was made an honorary fellow of the Royal College of Pathologists. In 2006, it was announced that Sir Philip Cohen would be taking over as president of the Biochemical Society. In 2008, Philip established and was Director of the SCottish Institute for ceLL Signalling (SCILLS). 

In 2012, the MRC Protein Phosphorylation Unit expanded its research focus and absorbed SCILLS to become the MRC Protein Phosphorylation and Ubiquitylation Unit. He was Director of the Division of Signal Transduction Therapy from its founding in 1998 until 2012. He is currently Deputy Director.

Awards and recognition
He has received many awards for his work, including the 1992 Prix van Gysel of the Belgian Royal Academies of Medicine, a Special Achievement Award at the 1996 Miami Biotechnology Winter Symposium, the Louis-Jeantet Prize for Medicine in 1997, the Datta Medal of the Federation of European Biochemical Societies the same year, the Debrecen Award for Molecular Medicine in 2004 and a Royal Medal in 2008 for "his major contribution to our understanding of the role of protein phosphorylation in cell regulation". He has also been given honorary DSc degrees from the universities of Abertay, Strathclyde, Linköping and Debrecen. He is now in the National Academy of Sciences.

References

External links
 Professional profile

1945 births
Living people
Fellows of the Royal Society
Fellows of the Royal Society of Edinburgh
Fellows of the Academy of Medical Sciences (United Kingdom)
Members of the European Molecular Biology Organization
People from Hendon
Albert Einstein World Award of Science Laureates
British biologists
Royal Medal winners
Alumni of University College London
University of Washington alumni
Knights Bachelor
Foreign associates of the National Academy of Sciences
Academics of the University of Dundee
Fellows of the Australian Academy of Science